Retravision is a Western Australian-based consumer electronics retailer of computers, technology products, home entertainment products, laundry and kitchen appliances, air-conditioning products, small appliances and homewares. The retailer was founded in 1961 in Osborne Park, Western Australia. As of January 2022 there are 19 stores across Australia with 17 stores in Western Australia, one in South Australia and one in the Northern Territory.

References

External links 
 Official website
Consumer electronics retailers of Australia
1961 establishments in Australia
Retail companies established in 1961

Consumer electronics retailers of Australia
1961 establishments in Australia
Retail companies established in 1961